Pheles  is a genus in the butterfly family Riodinidae present only in the Neotropical realm.

Species
Pheles atricolor (Butler, 1871) present in French Guiana, Brazil and Peru
Pheles bicolor (Godman & Salvin, [1886]) present in Panama and Costa Rica (requires confirmation)
Pheles eulesca (Dyar, 1909) present in Mexico and Panama
Pheles heliconides Herrich-Schäffer, [1858] present in French Guiana, Guyana, Ecuador and Brazil
Pheles incerta Staudinger, [1887] present in Colombia and Peru
Pheles melanchroia (C. & R. Felder, [1865]) present in Mexico and Guatemala
Pheles ochracea (Stichel, 1910) present in Venezuela and Panama
Pheles strigosa (Staudinger, 1876) present in Panama, Ecuador, Colombia and Peru

Sources 
Pheles sur funet

External links

Pheles at butterflies of america

Riodininae
Riodinidae of South America
Butterfly genera
Taxa named by Gottlieb August Wilhelm Herrich-Schäffer